Gillams is a town located north west of the city of Corner Brook in the Canadian province of Newfoundland and Labrador.

Demographics 

See also
List of cities and towns in Newfoundland and Labrador

References

Populated coastal places in Canada
Towns in Newfoundland and Labrador